Olivier Tambosi (born 7 July 1963) is an Austrian opera and operetta director.

Life and career 
Born in Paris, Tambosi studied music theatre direction at the University of Vienna. Philosophy and Theology, and at the University of Music and Performing Arts Vienna.

In 1990, he founded the Neue Oper Wien (artistic director until 1993). Subsequently, he was head of musical theatre at the Stadttheater Klagenfurt until 1996. Since 1996 he has made guest appearances internationally as a director and has worked among others with conductors Philippe Auguin, John Axelrod, Bruno Bartoletti, Jiří Bělohlávek, Dietfried Bernet, Daniele Callegari, Paolo Carignani, Frédéric Chaslin, James Conlon, Dennis Russell Davies, Mark Elder, Mikko Franck, Bernard Haitink, Jakub Hrůša, Vladimir Jurowski, Karen Kamensek, Peter Keuschnig, Axel Kober, Walter Kobéra, Nicola Luisotti, Jun Märkl, Seiji Ozawa, Antonio Pappano, Donald Runnicles, Peter Schneider, Patrick Summers, Alexander Soddy.

Among the singers Tambosi has worked with are Marcelo Álvarez, Daniela Barcellona, Joseph Calleja, Barbara Frittoli, Ferruccio Furlanetto, Lucio Gallo, Vladimir Galouzin, Eric Halfvarsson, Dmitri Hvorostovsky, Angelika Kirchschlager, Éva Marton, Karita Mattila, Deborah Polaski, Neil Shicoff, Anja Silja, Nina Stemme, Bryn Terfel, Ramón Vargas, Christopher Ventris, Linda Watson and Eva-Maria Westbroek.

His engagements have taken him in Austria among others to the Graz Opera, the Landestheater Linz, the Vienna Volksoper and the Bregenz Festival, in Germany to the Staatsoper Hannover, the Staatstheater am Gärtnerplatz Munich, in Europe at the Liceu Barcelona, the Royal Opera House Covent Garden, National Opera Helsinki, the Strasbourg Opera and to the Lucerne Festival, the Theater Biel Solothurn, in America to the Metropolitan Opera New York, to Chicago, Houston, San Francisco Opera and Los Angeles, San Diego Opera as well as to the Saito Kinen Festival in Japan.

Tambosi is married with the Swiss soprano Christiane Boesiger (born 1966 in Zürich).

Mises en scene 
Henry Purcell
 King Arthur
Georg Philipp Telemann
 Pimpinone
Giovanni Battista Pergolesi
 La serva padrona
Christoph Willibald Gluck
 Orfeo ed Euridice
Joseph Haydn
 La fedeltà premiata
Antonio Salieri
 Prima la musica e poi le parole
Wolfgang Amadeus Mozart
 Bastien und Bastienne
 Idomeneo
 Die Entführung aus dem Serail
 Le nozze di Figaro
 Don Giovanni
 Così fan tutte
 Die Zauberflöte
Luigi Cherubini
 Médée
Gaetano Donizetti
 L'elisir d'amore
 Don Pasquale
 Lucia di Lammermoor
 Maria Stuarda
Richard Wagner
 Tristan und Isolde
 Die Meistersinger von Nürnberg
Giuseppe Verdi
 Luisa Miller
 Macbeth
 Rigoletto
 La traviata
 Un ballo in maschera
 Otello
 Falstaff
Jacques Offenbach
 The Tales of Hoffmann
Johann Strauss II
 Die Fledermaus
Georges Bizet
 Carmen Project
Franco Faccio
 Amleto
Arrigo Boito
 Nerone
Carl Millöcker
 Gasparone
Engelbert Humperdinck
 Hänsel und Gretel
Oscar Wilde
 De Profundis (Schauspiel)
Ruggero Leoncavallo
 Pagliacci
Giacomo Puccini
 Manon Lescaut
 La Bohème
 Madama Butterfly
Pietro Mascagni
 Cavalleria rusticana
Leoš Janáček
 Jenůfa
 Věc Makropulos
Claude Debussy
 Pelléas et Mélisande
Richard Strauss
 Der Rosenkavalier
Franz Lehár
 Die lustige Witwe
Alexander von Zemlinsky
 Der Zwerg
 Eine florentinische Tragödie
Arnold Schönberg
 Pierrot Lunaire
Arnold Schönberg, Kurt Weill
 Cabaret Songs
Ermanno Wolf-Ferrari
 Il segreto di Susanna
Franz Schreker
 Irrelohe
Alban Berg
 Wozzeck
 Lulu
Emmerich Kálmán
 Gräfin Mariza
Eduard Künneke
 Der Vetter aus Dingsda
Igor Stravinsky
 The Rake’s Progress
Darius Milhaud
 Le pauvre matelot
Francis Poulenc
 La voix humaine
Karl Amadeus Hartmann
 Simplicius Simplicissimus
Gian Carlo Menotti
 The Telephone
Benjamin Britten
 Death in Venice
 A Midsummer Night's Dream
Astor Piazzolla
 María de Buenos Aires
Mitch Leigh/Dale Wasserman
 Man of La Mancha
Stephen Sondheim
 Sweeney Todd
 Into the Woods
Dieter Kaufmann
 Die Reise ins Paradies
 Dolores
Andrew Lloyd Webber
 Joseph and the Amazing Technicolor Dreamcoat
Bruno Strobl
 Hier ist es schön
Kaija Saariaho
 L’amour de loin
Zesses Seglias
 To the Lighthouse
Sehyung Kim
 Consumnia

References

Further reading 
 Oswald Panagl: Tambosi, Olivier in Oesterreichisches Musiklexikon. Online edition, Vienna 2002 ff., ; Print edition: vol. 5, Österreichischen Akademie der Wissenschaften press, Vienna 2006, .

Austrian opera directors
Austrian theatre directors
1963 births
Living people
Theatre directors from Paris